Elections to Watford Council were held on 1 May 2008. One third of the council was up for election and the Liberal Democrat party stayed in overall control of the council.

The election saw only one seat change hands, Vicarage ward saw the Labour party gain the seat from the Liberal Democrats. However the Liberal Democrats remained firmly in control of the council.

After the election, the composition of the council was:
Liberal Democrat 27
Conservative 3
Green 3
Labour 3

Council election result

Ward results

References

2004 Watford election result
Ward results
Watford election results

2008 English local elections
2008
2000s in Hertfordshire